General elections were held in Brazil on 7 October 2018 to elect the president, National Congress and state governors. As no candidate in the presidential election received more than 50% of the vote in the first round, a runoff round was held on 28 October.

The election occurred during a tumultuous time in Brazilian politics. Narrowly re-elected in 2014, President Dilma Rousseff of the centre-left Workers’ Party (PT), which had dominated Brazilian politics since 2002, was impeached in 2016. Replacing her was her Vice President, Michel Temer of the centre-right Brazilian Democratic Movement Party. Temer, whose age of 75 at inauguration made him the oldest to ever take office, broke sharply with his predecessor's policies and amended the constitution to freeze public spending. He was extraordinarily unpopular, reaching an approval rating of 7% versus 76% in favor of his resignation. Despite mass demonstrations against his governance, including a 2017 general strike and a 2018 truck drivers’ strike, Temer refused to step down and served the duration of his term in office. Due to being convicted of breaking campaign finance laws, Temer was ineligible to run in 2018.

The candidacy of Jair Bolsonaro, a controversial federal deputy from Rio de Janeiro known for his far-right politics and defense of the former Brazilian military dictatorship, overshadowed other conservative candidates. Noted for his vehement opposition to abortion and same-sex marriage, Bolsonaro joined the small Social Liberal Party (PSL) to mount his bid for the presidency, shifting the party's ideology in favor of social conservatism and nationalism. Bolsonaro benefited from opposition to the former PT government and ran in favor of expanding gun ownership in response to high crime, legalizing the death penalty, and the privatization of state-owned companies. For the position of Vice President, Bolsonaro chose Hamilton Mourão, a conservative retired general in the Brazilian Army. During the campaign, Bolsonaro was the subject of widespread protests for his homophobic, racist, and misogynistic beliefs. Former Governor of São Paulo Geraldo Alckmin, who ran as a member of the previously dominant centre-right Brazilian Social Democracy Party (PSDB), received the worst result for a presidential nominee of his party in Brazilian history.

Former President Lula da Silva, once considered one of the most popular politicians in the world, intended to run for president as the candidate of the PT with former Mayor of São Paulo Fernando Haddad as his running-mate. Polling taken during the campaign found Lula as the favorite in both the first and second rounds of the election. However, Lula's 2017 conviction on corruption charges barred him from running. Haddad, who was largely unknown to Brazilian voters at the time, was chosen to run in his place, with Communist Party of Brazil (PCdoB) deputy Manuela d’Avila of Rio Grande do Sul serving as his running mate. His major opponent on the left was Ciro Gomes, a mainstay of Brazilian politics who ran a centre-left campaign as a member of the Democratic Labour Party (PDT). Following Haddad's advancement to the second round, Ciro did not endorse his campaign, though he did signal opposition to Bolsonaro.

The campaign was marked by political violence, with Bolsonaro being a victim of a stabbing attack at a campaign rally in Minas Gerais and supporters of both Haddad and Bolsonaro falling victim to politically-motivated attacks. Fake news spread on popular messaging app WhatsApp was a focal point of election coverage, with disinformation spread on the app being blamed for influencing voting intentions. In the first round of the election, Bolsonaro received approximately 46% of the vote to Haddad's 29%, with Ciro coming in third place with over 12% of the vote. In the second round, Bolsonaro defeated Haddad by approximately ten percentage points, with the deputy receiving over 55% of the vote to less than 45% for Haddad. Bolsonaro took office on 1 January 2019 as President of Brazil.

Background
The 2014 elections saw Workers' Party candidate Dilma Rousseff reelected as President in the second round with 51.6% of the vote, defeating Aécio Neves of the Brazilian Social Democracy Party who received 48.4% of the vote. Rousseff had first been elected in the 2010 elections, succeeding her political mentor, Luiz Inácio Lula da Silva, who was in office from 2003 until 2011.

However, on 3 December 2015, impeachment proceedings against Rousseff were officially accepted by the Chamber of Deputies. On 12 May 2016, the Federal Senate temporarily suspended Rousseff's powers and duties for up to six months or until the Senate reached a verdict: to remove her from office if found guilty or to acquit her from the crimes charged. Vice President Michel Temer, of the Brazilian Democratic Movement Party, assumed her powers and duties as Acting President of Brazil during the suspension. On 31 August 2016, the Senate voted 61–20 in favor of impeachment, finding Rousseff guilty of breaking budgetary laws and removing her from office. Critics of the impeachment saw it as a legislative coup d'état. Vice President Temer succeeded Rousseff as the 37th President of Brazil. His government implemented policies that contradicted the platform on which Rousseff's Workers Party had been elected, in one of the most controversial and heated political periods of modern Brazilian history.

Temer was barred from running for a full term in 2018. He had been convicted of campaign law violations in 2016, and was banned from holding any political office for eight years. He was likely ineligible for a full term in any case due to the manner in which constitutional provisions on term limits are worded. The constitution stipulates that if the Vice President becomes Acting President for any reason, it counts toward the limit of two consecutive terms. This applies even when the Vice President becomes Acting President whenever the President is abroad.

Electoral system

Voting in Brazil is allowed for citizens over 16 years of age and mandatory for those between 18 and 70 years of age. Those who do not vote in an election and do not later present an acceptable justification (such as being away from their voting location at the time) must pay a fine of 3.51 BRL (equivalent to 0.90 USD in October 2018). Brazilian citizens residing abroad only vote for president.

Presidential elections
The President and the Vice President of Brazil are elected using the two-round system. Citizens may field their candidacies for the presidency, and participate in the general elections, which are held on the first Sunday in October (in this instance, 7 October 2018). Candidates reciving more than 50% of the overall vote are declared elected. If the 50% threshold is not met by any candidate, a second round of voting is held on the last Sunday in October (in this instance, 28 October 2018). In the second round, only the two most-voted candidates from the first round may participate. The winner of the second round is elected President of Brazil. Candidates for President run for office jointly with a candidate for Vice-President, and the Vice-President is elected as a consequence of the election of the President.

Gubernatorial elections

The Governors and Vice Governors of all states and of the Federal District are elected in the same way as the president, using two rounds of voting if necessary.

Congressional elections

Federal Senate elections
In 2018, two-thirds of the 81 members of the Federal Senate were elected for a term of 8 years in office, the other third having been elected in 2014. Two candidates will be elected from each of the states and Federal District using majority block voting, with voters able to cast two votes each.

Chamber of Deputies elections
All 513 members of the Chamber of Deputies (federal deputies) are elected, with candidates elected from 27 multi-member constituencies corresponding to the states and Federal District, varying in size from eight to 70 seats. The Chamber elections are held using open list proportional representation, with seats allocated using the simple quotient.

Legislative Assemblies elections
All members of the State Legislative Assemblies (state deputies) and of the Federal District Legislative Chamber (district deputies), varying in size from 24 to 94 seats, will be elected. These elections are also held using open list proportional representation, with seats allocated using the simple quotient.

Presidential candidates

Candidates in runoff

Candidates failing to make runoff

Lost in primaries or conventions

Brazilian Social Democracy Party (PSDB)
 Arthur Virgílio Neto, Mayor of Manaus (1989–1992, 2013–)

Democrats (DEM)
 Ronaldo Caiado, Senator for Goiás (2015–)
 Antônio Carlos Magalhães Neto, Mayor of Salvador (2013–); President of the Democrats (2018–)
 Mendonça Filho, Minister of Education (2016–2018)

Party of National Mobilization (PMN)
 Valéria Monteiro, journalist, model, actress, and television presenter

Social Democratic Party (PSD)
 Guilherme Afif Domingos, former Vice Governor of São Paulo (2011–15)

Socialism and Liberty Party (PSOL)
 Plínio de Arruda Sampaio Jr., economist and professor at University of Campinas; son of late 2010 nominee Plínio de Arruda Sampaio.
 Hamilton Assis, former leader of Central Única dos Trabalhadores of Bahia (1993–1996)
 Nildo Ouriques, economist and professor at UFSC
 Sônia Guajajara, indigenous activist and militant ecosocialist

Brazilian Democratic Movement (MDB)
Roberto Requião, Senator for Paraná (1995–2002 and 2011–)
 Germano Rigotto, former Governor of Rio Grande do Sul (2003–07)

Brazilian Labour Renewal Party (PRTB)
Levy Fidelix, President of the PRTB (1994–) and nominee for President in 2010 and 2014
Antônio Hamilton Mourão, Brazilian Army general

Brazilian Republican Party (PRB)
 Flávio Rocha, CEO and Chairman of Lojas Riachuelo (2005–) and former Federal Deputy for Rio Grande do Norte (1987–95)

Brazilian Social Democracy Party (PSDB)
 João Doria, former Mayor of São Paulo (2017–18)
 Aécio Neves, Senator for Minas Gerais (2010–) and nominee for President in 2014
 José Serra, Senator for São Paulo (1996–1998, 2002–03, 2015–16 and 2017–) and nominee for President in 2002 and 2010

Brazilian Socialist Party (PSB)
 Joaquim Barbosa, former Minister of the Supreme Federal Court (2003–14)

Christian Labour Party (PTC)
 Fernando Collor de Mello,  former President of Brazil (1990–92) and Senator for Alagoas (2007–)

Communist Party of Brazil (PCdoB)
Manuela d'Ávila, former Federal Deputy for Rio Grande do Sul (2007–2015)
 Flávio Dino, Governor of Maranhão (2015–)

Democrats (DEM)
 Rodrigo Maia, President of the Chamber of Deputies (2016–) and Federal Deputy for Rio Grande do Sul (1999–)

Green Party (PV)
 Eduardo Jorge, former Federal Deputy for São Paulo (1987–2003)

Party of the Republic (PR)
Josué Gomes, President of the Coteminas Company
 Magno Malta, Senator for Espírito Santo (2003–)

Patriota (PATRI)
Roberto Rey, former Vice President of PATRI (2015–17)

Popular Socialist Party (PPS)
 Cristovam Buarque, Senator for the Federal District (2003–) and nominee for President in 2006

Progressive Party (PP)
 Blairo Maggi, Minister of Agriculture (2016-)

Social Christian Party (PSC)
Paulo Rabello de Castro, former President of the Brazilian Development Bank (2017–18) and the Brazilian Institute of Geography and Statistics (2016–17)

Socialism and Liberty Party (PSOL)
 Chico Alencar, Federal Deputy for Rio de Janeiro (2003–)
 Marcelo Freixo, State Deputy of Rio de Janeiro (2007–)
 Luciana Genro, former Federal Deputy for Rio Grande do Sul (2003–11) and nominee for President in 2014

Solidarity (SD)
 Aldo Rebelo, former President of the Chamber of Deputies (2005–2007) and member of the Rousseff cabinet (2011–16)

Workers' Party (PT)
 Fernando Pimentel, Governor of Minas Gerais (2015–)

Other
 Silvio Santos, Owner of Grupo Silvio Santos (1958–)
 Pedro Parente, former President of Petrobras (2016–18)
 Roberto Justus, television presenter and Chairman of Grupo Newcomm (1998–)
 Luciano Huck, television presenter
 Luís Roberto Barroso, Minister of the Supreme Federal Court (2013-)

Campaign

Rejection of Lula's candidacy
On 1 September, the Superior Electoral Court voted 6–1 to reject Lula's candidacy based on the Lei da Ficha Limpa and his conviction on corruption charges, but approved the PT-PCdoB-PROS coalition "The People Happy Again" and the candidacy of Fernando Haddad. The Workers' Party replaced Lula with Haddad and announced former presidential candidate Manuela d'Ávila as his running mate.

Stabbing of Jair Bolsonaro

Jair Bolsonaro was stabbed on 6 September 2018 while campaigning in the city of Juiz de Fora, Minas Gerais and interacting with supporters. Bolsonaro's son, Flávio, stated that his father's wounds were only superficial and he was recovering in hospital. Police arrested and identified the attacker as Adelio Bispo de Oliveira, who claimed that he was "ordered by God to carry out the attack". Flávio Bolsonaro later stated that the wounds inflicted seemed worse than initially thought. He tweeted about his father's condition, explaining that the perforation reached part of the liver, the lung and part of the intestine. He also stated that Bolsonaro had lost a large amount of blood, arriving at the hospital with a pressure of 10/3, but had since stabilized. Most of the other candidates in the presidential race as well as and the then-Brazilian president, Michel Temer, condemned the attack. After being stabbed, Bolsonaro did not attend any further debates.

Debates
Two debates were held on 9 and 17 August, featuring eight presidential candidates: Bolsonaro, Alckmin, Silva, Gomes, Dias, Meirelles, Boulos, and Daciolo.  Lula was unable to participate in the debates.  The 9 August debate was moderated by Ricardo Boechat, and the 17 August debate was moderated by Amanda Klein, Boris Casoy and Mariana Godoy.

A debate scheduled for 27 August was canceled after Jair Bolsonaro expressed his uncertainty about participating in the debates and the Workers' Party insisted on the participation of Lula, prohibited by the Electoral Justice. Bolsonaro did not participate in further debates after he was attacked on 6 September.

After a debate on 9 September moderated by Maria Lydia Flândoli, Fernando Haddad participated in all remaining debates. These occurred on 20 September (moderated by Joyce Ribeiro), 26 September (moderated by Carlos Nascimento), 30 September (moderated by Adriana Araújo and Celso Freitas), and 4 October (moderated by William Bonner).

A vice presidential debate was held on 5 September featuring four candidates; Fernando Haddad did not attend.

While several debates were scheduled for the second round, none were held. Debates planned for 12 October, 14 October, and 15 October were cancelled due to Bolsonaro's health issues.  A debate scheduled for 21 October was cancelled after the campaigns were unable to agree to terms.

Opinion polls

Results

President

By state

First round

Second round

Voter demographics

Chamber of Deputies

Senate

Aftermath and reactions

Americas

Argentina 
 President Mauricio Macri congratulated Bolsonaro on his election victory, stating that, "I hope we will work together soon for the relationship between our countries and the welfare of Argentines and Brazilians."

Bolivia 
 President Evo Morales expressed his congratulations, "we greet the brother people of Brazil for their democratic participation in the second round of presidential elections in which Jair Bolsonaro was elected, to whom we extend our recognition. Bolivia and Brazil are brother peoples with deep integration ties."

Chile 
 President Sebastián Piñera expressed his congratulations on Twitter, "congratulations to the Brazilian people for a clean and democratic election. I congratulate Jair Bolsonaro for your great electoral triumph."

Colombia 
 President Iván Duque praised Bolsonaro on Twitter. "Congratulations to Jair Bolsonaro, the new democratically elected president of Brazil. Our wish for this new stage of the neighboring country to be one of well-being and unity. We look forward to continuing our fellowship relationship to strengthen political, commercial and cultural ties."

Costa Rica 
 President Carlos Alvarado using his official Twitter account expressed: "Costa Rica ratifies its willingness to work with Brazil in favor of inclusion, economic growth and respect for the rights of all people, as well as to achieve the sustainable development of the region."

Ecuador 
 President Lenín Moreno expressed on Twitter, "More congratulations to the Brazilian people for this new democratic feat. Best wishes for new President Jair Bolsonaro."

Mexico 
 President Enrique Peña Nieto praised Bolsonaro on Twitter. "On behalf of the people and the Government of Mexico, I congratulate Jair Bolsonaro for his election as President of the Federative Republic of Brazil, on an exemplary day that reflects the democratic strength of that country."

Paraguay 
 President Mario Abdo Benítez expressed on Twitter, "congratulations to the people of Brazil and their elected president Jair Bolsonaro for this election! We want to work together for stronger democracies in the region, with strengthened institutions and always looking for the prosperity of our peoples!"

Peru 
 President Martín Vizcarra congratulated Bolsonaro on his election, "I congratulate Jair Bolsonaro for his election as president of Brazil and I wish him the greatest success in his administration. I express my willingness to work together to deepen our fraternal bilateral relationship."

United States 
 President Donald Trump congratulated Bolsonaro on his election victory. Trump and Bolsonaro both agreed to work side-by-side to improve the lives of the people of the United States and Brazil, and as regional leaders, of the Americas.

Asia

China 
 President Xi Jinping congratulated Bolsonaro on his election, and said that his country was willing to "respect the fundamental interests" of both nations. He also congratulated the statements made by Bolsonaro shortly after winning the elections, in which he assured that Brazil will maintain ties with China, its main trading partner, regardless of its ideological differences.

Europe

France 
 President Emmanuel Macron congratulated Bolsonaro on his election victory, added that France would look to continue to cooperate with Brazil on areas including environmental issues. “France and Brazil have a strategic partnership based around common values of respect and the promotion of democratic principles,” added Macron in his statement.
 President of the National Rally Party Marine Le Pen praised Bolsonaro on his election victory, "Brazilians just punished the widespread corruption and terrifying crime that thrived during far left governments. Good luck to President Bolsonaro who will have to re-establish Brazil's very compromised economic, security and democratic situation."

Germany 
 According to an official publication, the Chancellor Angela Merkel said she "hopes that their cooperation will continue to be based on democratic values and the rule of law. Two countries have long been linked by friendly relations and common interests."

Russia 
 According to an official publication from the Kremlin, President Vladimir Putin: "praised the significant experience of mutually beneficial bilateral cooperation in various spheres that Russia and Brazil have acquired as part of their strategic collaboration" and "expressed confidence in the further promotion of the entire complex of Russian-Brazilian ties as well as constructive cooperation in the framework of the United Nations, the G20, BRICS and other multilateral organisations in the interests of the Russian and Brazilian people."

Italy 
 Deputy Prime Minister Matteo Salvini praised Bolsonaro on Twitter. "In Brazil citizens expelled the left! Good job for President Bolsonaro, the friendship between our peoples and government will be even stronger".

Spain 
 Prime Minister Pedro Sánchez expressed on Twitter, "The Brazilian people have decided their future for years to come. The challenges will be huge. Brazil will always count on Spain to achieve a more egalitarian and fairer Latin America, the hope that will illuminate the decisions of any ruler."

Middle East

Israel 
 Prime Minister Benjamin Netanyahu congratulated Bolsonaro on his election victory, stating that, "I am confident that your election will bring great friendship between the two peoples and strengthen the ties between Brazil and Israel."

See also
Ele Não movement – protests against the candidacy of Bolsonaro
2018 in Brazil
2018 São Paulo gubernatorial election
2018 Rio de Janeiro gubernatorial election
2018 Espírito Santo gubernatorial election

Notes

References

Further reading
Amaral, Oswald E. “The Victory of Jair Bolsonaro According to the Brazilian Electoral Study of 2018.” Brazilian Political Science Review (2020).  14 (1): e0004 -1/13 online
 Bloch, Agata, and Marco Vallada Lemonte. "Introduction to the Meteoric Political Rise of Brazilian President Jair Bolsonaro Under a Crisis of the 'Brazilianness'." Ameryka Łacińska. Kwartalnik Analityczno-Informacyjny 4.106 (2020): 1-22. online
Boito, Armando. "Reform and Political Crisis in Brazil: Class Conflicts in Workers' Party Governments and the Rise of Bolsonaro Neo-fascism." in Reform and Political Crisis in Brazil (Brill, 2021).
Chagas-Bastos, Fabrício H. "Political realignment in Brazil: Jair Bolsonaro and the right turn." Revista de Estudios Sociales 69 (2019): 92-100. online
Da Silva, Antonio José Bacelar, and Erika Robb Larkins. "The Bolsonaro election, antiblackness, and changing race relations in Brazil." Journal of Latin American and Caribbean Anthropology 24.4 (2019): 893-913. online
Duque, Debora, and Amy Erica Smith. "The Establishment Upside Down: A Year of Change in Brazil." Revista de Ciencia Política 39.2 (2019). online
Layton, Matthew L., et al. "Demographic polarization and the rise of the far right: Brazil's 2018 presidential election." Research & Politics 8.1 (2021): 2053168021990204. online
Santana, Carlos Henrique Vieira, and Marcela Nogueira Ferrario. "Crafting Negative Partisanship in Brazil and the Rise of Bolsonaro in the 2018 Election." (2021) online.

External links

Official campaign websites
Geraldo Alckmin (PSDB, DEM, PP, PR, PRB, SD, PTB, PSD, PPS) para Presidente
João Amoêdo (NOVO) para Presidente
Jair Bolsonaro (PSL, PRTB) para Presidente
Guilhemere Boulos (PSOL, PCB) para Presidente
Álvaro Dias (PODE, PSC, PTC, PRP) para Presidente
José Maria Eymael (DC) para Presidente
Ciro Gomes (PDT, AVANTE) para Presidente
Fernando Haddad (PT, PROS, PCdoB) para Presidente
Vera Lúcia (PSTU) para Presidente
Henrique Meirelles (MDB, PHS) para Presidente
Marina Silva (REDE, PV) para Presidente

Infographics
Map of first round results divided by electoral zones

 
Brazil
General elections in Brazil
Brazil
Presidential elections in Brazil